Lekgotla Mosope (born July 25, 1983) is a professional squash player who represents Botswana. He reached a career-high world ranking of World No. 132 in March 2010.

References

External links 
 
 

Botswana squash players
Living people
1983 births